Sportsklubben Bergen Sparta is a Norwegian sports club from Bergen, founded in 1925 and named after Sparta. It has sections for amateur boxing, and formerly for association football.

It was a member of Arbeidernes Idrettsforbund before the Second World War. It was founded on 18 November 1925.

Well-known amateur boxers include Dagfinn Næss (1960 Olympian). The King's Cup in boxing was taken by Dagfinn Næss in 1954, 1958, 1960 and 1961.

The men's football team played in the Third Division, the fourth tier of Norwegian football, in 1994, 1995, 1997 and 2004. They played home matches at Varden. This section is currently defunct.

References

External links
 Official site 

Sports teams in Norway
Sport in Bergen
Association football clubs established in 1925
Defunct football clubs in Norway
Arbeidernes Idrettsforbund
1925 establishments in Norway